Charles Marsh Webb (Nash) Gilbert (18 March 1867 – 3 October 1925), known professionally as C. Web Gilbert, was a self-taught Australian sculptor renowned both within Australia and abroad.

Gilbert was born at Cockatoo in Victoria, between Talbot and Maryborough. His father died when he was two months old, and his mother was left with three young children. Gilbert received a state school education but began to earn his living before he was 10 years old. Coming to Melbourne, he obtained a position at Parer's Crystal Café & Hotel where he eventually became a pastry chef. It has been stated that the modelling of ornaments for wedding cakes first turned his thoughts in the direction of sculpture. He entered the national gallery drawing school in 1888 and attended for two and a half years, but never went on to the painting school. In the late 1890s he began to exhibit at the Yarra Sculptors' Society and the Victorian Artists' Society. Until 1905 his work was all in marble and when he began experimenting in casting in bronze he met with many difficulties and could find no one in Melbourne to help him. He persevered, became an excellent caster, and among others did portrait heads in bronze of John Mather, A. McClintock, John Shirlow, Hugh McCrae and Bernard O'Dowd. The last was acquired for the National Gallery of Victoria in 1913 under the Felton bequest.

In May 1914, encouraged and helped by an American resident of Melbourne, Hugo Meyer, Gilbert went to London and in spite of the war persevered with his work as he was well over military age . He exhibited at the Royal Academy where the sincerity of his work met with early appreciation, and in 1917 his marble head "The Critic" was purchased for the Tate Gallery through the Chantrey Bequest. He was nominated also for an associateship of the Royal Academy. He was then employed as a war artist by the Commonwealth government and made, for the war museum, many models of land over which the Australians fought. He returned to Australia in 1920 and completed the 2nd Division monument, which was afterwards unveiled at Mont St. Quentin in the presence of Marshal Foch.

His other war memorials include large and dramatic bronze sculptures of Australian soldiers in public streets in Broken Hill in New South Wales and the City of Burnside in South Australia, as well as those for the Melbourne University medical school and the Victorian Chamber of Manufacturers. Another important work was the group of three figures for the Matthew Flinders memorial which stands outside St Paul's Cathedral, Melbourne. His next important piece of work was the Australian Memorial for Port Said. Gilbert had always been accustomed to doing everything for himself, and wore himself out carrying clay for the huge full size model and died suddenly on 3 October 1925. He married Alice Rose Eugenia Daniell in 1887, they divorced in 1911. He married again while in London and left a widow, Mabel Annette Gilbert, née Woodstock, with three children, daughter Marj, and identical twin sons, Charlie and Jim.

Gilbert is buried at Coburg Cemetery, Preston, Victoria. His grave is included in a self-guided heritage walk at the cemetery and information about his life and death are available on a sign posted at his graveside.

References

G. Sturgeon, 'Gilbert, Charles Marsh Web (Nash) (1867–1925)', Australian Dictionary of Biography, Volume 9, Melbourne University Press, 1983, pp 1–2. <http://adbonline.anu.edu.au/biogs/A090001b.htm>

1867 births
1925 deaths
People from Maryborough, Victoria
20th-century Australian sculptors
19th-century Australian sculptors
Artists from Victoria (Australia)